Live in Hamburg is the fifth album by American singer-songwriter Maria McKee, released in 2004 (see 2004 in music).

Track listing
All songs by Maria McKee, except where noted

"This Perfect Dress" – 5:27
"Scarlover" – 6:37
"High Dive" – 5:17
"T.V. Teens" – 5:13
"Be My Joy" – 5:42
"I'm Awake" – 4:11
"Absolutely Barking Stars" – 5:05
"Breathe" (McKee, Gregg Sutton) – 4:17
"Something Similar" – 8:50
"Life Is Sweet" – 12:23

Personnel
Maria McKee – guitar, vocals

Production
Cover photo: Lauren Abrahams
Photography: Jim Akin

References

Maria McKee albums
2004 live albums